Ernie Jenkins (20 September 1880 – 18 July 1958) was a Welsh international dual-code international rugby player. He played club rugby union predominantly for Newport, and later switched codes by joining rugby league team Rochdale Hornets. While playing for Newport, Jenkins faced the three major Southern Hemisphere teams, Australia, South Africa and New Zealand.

International career
Jenkins made his début for Wales against Scotland at the Cardiff Arms Park on 5 February 1910 as part of the Five Nations Championship. It was a one-sided affair with Wales scoring 4 tries without reply, including one from fellow new cap Billy Spiller. Jenkins was reselected for the next match in the tournament, this time against Ireland. Wales won again, this time scoring five tries, the highest number scored by Wales in Ireland. With two wins out of two games, Jenkins should have been part of future Welsh teams, but turned professional in September 1910, joining rugby league team Rochdale Hornets, making him ineligible to play union in future.

His first game for the Hornets took place on 17 September 1910, and on 10 December he was selected for his first rugby league international when he was chosen to represent Wales against England at Coventry. He played a total of four league international between 1910 and 1912, three against England and a single encounter against Australia at Ebbw Vale.

County Cup Final appearances
Ernie Jenkins played as a forward, i.e. number 13, in Rochdale Hornets' 12–5 victory over Oldham in the 1911–12 Lancashire County Cup Final during the 1911–12 season at Wheater's Field, Broughton, Salford on Saturday 2 December 1911, in front of a crowd of 20,000.

International games played
Wales (rugby union)
  1910
  1910

Wales (rugby league)
  1910, 1911, 1912
  1911

Bibliography

References

1880 births
1958 deaths
Dual-code rugby internationals
Newport RFC players
Rugby league players from Cwmbran
Rochdale Hornets players
Rugby union flankers
Rugby union players from Cwmbran
Wales international rugby union players
Wales national rugby league team players
Welsh rugby league players
Welsh rugby union players